Justin Evans may refer to:

 Justin Evans (soccer), born 1977
 Justin Evans (American football), born 1995